The men's 200 metre freestyle event at the 1972 Summer Olympics took place on August 29 at the Olympia Schwimmhalle. There were 46 competitors from 27 nations, with each nation having up to three swimmers. The event was won by Mark Spitz of the United States, the nation's second victory in the event (68 years, but only two appearances of the event, apart). It was the third gold medal for Spitz in 1972, halfway to his goal of six (he would ultimately finish the Games with seven). His teammate Steve Genter took silver, with Werner Lampe of West Germany earning bronze. Defending champion Michael Wenden of Australia finished fourth.

Background

This was the fourth appearance of the 200 metre freestyle event. It was first contested in 1900. It would be contested a second time, though at 220 yards, in 1904. After that, the event did not return until 1968; since then, it has been on the programme at every Summer Games.

Two of the 8 finalists from the 1968 Games returned: gold medalist Michael Wenden of Australia and fourth-place finisher Ralph Hutton of Canada. Mark Spitz was the world record holder and a heavy favourite coming into the Games, aiming for at least six gold medals. He had won the 200 fly and 4x100 free relay the day before this event. His biggest challenger was countryman Steve Genter, though Genter was hampered by pneumothorax while in Munich.

Brazil, Cambodia (then Khmer Republic), East Germany, Egypt, Iceland, Kuwait, Mexico, New Zealand, Romania, Venezuela, and Yugoslavia each made their debut in the event. Australia and the United States made their fourth appearance each, the only two nations to have competed in all prior editions of the event.

Competition format

The competition used a two-round (heats, final) format. The advancement rule followed the format introduced in 1952. A swimmer's place in the heat was not used to determine advancement; instead, the fastest times from across all heats in a round were used. There were 7 heats of between 5 and 8 swimmers each. The top 8 swimmers advanced to the final. Swim-offs were used as necessary to break ties.

This swimming event used freestyle swimming, which means that the method of the stroke is not regulated (unlike backstroke, breaststroke, and butterfly events). Nearly all swimmers use the front crawl or a variant of that stroke. Because an Olympic-size swimming pool is 50 metres long, this race consisted of four lengths of the pool.

Records

The standing world and Olympic records prior to this competition were as follows. Clark's Olympic record was set as the first leg in the 4 × 200 metre freestyle relay final.

Mark Spitz beat his own world record in the final, swimming 1:52.78.

Schedule

All times are Central European Time (UTC+1)

Results

Heats

The 8 fastest swimmers from the seven heats, without regard to place in heat, advanced to final.

Final

Spitz led at the first turn, followed by Bure. Genter, still recovering from his collapsed lung, took the lead at the halfway mark by .13 seconds (54.93 to 55.06 for Spitz). Genter held the lead through the final turn at 150 metres. Wenden, the defending champion, worked his way up to third by that mark. Spitz finished strong to win by nearly a full second over Genter. Lampe also finished strong, beating Wenden for bronze.

References

External links
Men 200m Freestyle Swimming Olympic Games 1972 Munchen (FRG)

Men's freestyle 200 metre
200 metre freestyle at the Olympics
Men's events at the 1972 Summer Olympics